The Briance is a  long river in the Haute-Vienne département, central France. Its source is at La Croisille-sur-Briance. It flows generally northwest. It is a left tributary of the Vienne into which it flows between Condat-sur-Vienne and Bosmie-l'Aiguille.

Communes along its course
This list is ordered from source to mouth: La Croisille-sur-Briance, Saint-Vitte-sur-Briance, Saint-Méard, Linards, Glanges, Saint-Bonnet-Briance, Saint-Genest-sur-Roselle, Vicq-sur-Breuilh, Saint-Hilaire-Bonneval, Pierre-Buffière, Saint-Jean-Ligoure, Boisseuil, Le Vigen, Solignac, Condat-sur-Vienne, Jourgnac, Bosmie-l'Aiguille

References

Rivers of France
Rivers of Haute-Vienne
Rivers of Nouvelle-Aquitaine